Exarcheia Self-Organized Health Structure is a social solidarity initiative in Exarcheia neighborhood of Athens with the aim of providing medical care to people who need it. It is located in Κ*ΒΟΞ, a squatted building near Exarcheia square.

On 21st April, 2012, the building (which was neglected and not hosting any service) was captured by anarchists with the aim to transform it in a self-organized social center. Police tried to stop the capture of the building, but anarchists helped by the residents of the area (which is known for its anti-authoritarian character) removed the metal sheets placed by the police and the squat functioned as planned.

The structure is staffed by doctors of several specializations, psychologists, nurses, pharmacists and non-expert residents of the area (for the non-medical functions of the structure). All services are offered free of charge. 

Decisions are taken by an open assembly with means of direct democracy. The structure has an anti-establishment character and distinguishes itself from charity.

References 

Anarchism in Greece